Joel Francis Bowden (born 21 June 1978) is an Australian politician, former union leader and former professional Australian rules footballer. He was elected to the Northern Territory Legislative Assembly at the 2020 Johnston by-election, representing the Australian Labor Party (ALP). He previously played professional football for the Richmond Football Club in the Australian Football League (AFL) from 1996 to 2009.

Early life
Bowden was born at the Mildura Base Hospital in Mildura, Victoria to mother Judy and father Michael Bowden (a Richmond Football Club premiership player), one of four biological brothers (including older brother Sean Bowden and younger brother Patrick Bowden) he was part of a football dynasty.

Bowden's family moved to the remote South Australian community of Ernabella in the 1980s as a very young boy where his father Michael was a community advisor. He spent a couple of years playing with indigenous children in the area. The family returned to Mildura for a few years before returning to Alice Springs in 1987 where Michael became a teacher and where Joel completed his schooling from the age of 9.

Joel played for the Northern Territory Schoolboys in 1993. He was named in the All-Australian Schoolboy’s team and won the J.L Williams Medal as best player. In 1994 he once again represented the Northern Territory. In addition to football, Bowden represented the Northern Territory twice in cricket at under 17 level.

AFL career
Bowden was drafted at the end of the 1995 AFL season under a father-son selection.

In 2006, Bowden was among the leading possession getters in the AFL, and had the most possessions shared between any two players with his brother Patrick. He played his 200th AFL game in round 8 against , gathering 34 possessions as the Tigers upset the then-ladder-leading Crows by three points just a week after suffering a 118-point loss to the Sydney Swans.

In round 16, 2008, Bowden was at the centre of a major controversy regarding rushed behinds. With Richmond up by 6 points against Essendon with less than a minute left, Bowden proceeded to wipe the remaining time off the clock by rushing 2 behinds from the kick out. These tactics which caused an uproar with many calling for the current rules to be changed; football journalist Mike Sheahan even likened it to the infamous Trevor Chappell underarm delivery incident. He played his last game against Collingwood in Round 20, 2009, who defeated Richmond by 93 points.

Statistics

|- style="background-color: #EAEAEA"
! scope="row" style="text-align:center" | 1996
|style="text-align:center;"|
| 11 || 5 || 4 || 3 || 17 || 14 || 31 || 7 || 3 || 0.8 || 0.6 || 3.4 || 2.8 || 6.2 || 1.4 || 0.6
|-
! scope="row" style="text-align:center" | 1997
|style="text-align:center;"|
| 11 || 13 || 21 || 9 || 146 || 75 || 221 || 51 || 21 || 1.6 || 0.7 || 11.2 || 5.8 || 17.0 || 3.9 || 1.6
|- style="background-color: #EAEAEA"
! scope="row" style="text-align:center" | 1998
|style="text-align:center;"|
| 11 || 18 || 17 || 19 || 178 || 131 || 309 || 72 || 36 || 0.9 || 1.1 || 9.9 || 7.3 || 17.2 || 4.0 || 2.0
|-
! scope="row" style="text-align:center" | 1999
|style="text-align:center;"|
| 11 || 22 || 15 || 11 || 238 || 183 || 421 || 82 || 38 || 0.7 || 0.5 || 10.8 || 8.3 || 19.1 || 3.7 || 1.7
|- style="background-color: #EAEAEA"
! scope="row" style="text-align:center" | 2000
|style="text-align:center;"|
| 11 || 22 || 19 || 14 || 293 || 203 || 496 || 124 || 51 || 0.9 || 0.6 || 13.3 || 9.2 || 22.5 || 5.6 || 2.3
|-
! scope="row" style="text-align:center" | 2001
|style="text-align:center;"|
| 11 || 25 || 26 || 22 || 381 || 210 || 591 || 149 || 51 || 1.0 || 0.9 || 15.2 || 8.4 || 23.6 || 6.0 || 2.0
|- style="background-color: #EAEAEA"
! scope="row" style="text-align:center" | 2002
|style="text-align:center;"|
| 11 || 22 || 18 || 17 || 334 || 171 || 505 || 125 || 63 || 0.8 || 0.8 || 15.2 || 7.8 || 23.0 || 5.7 || 2.9
|-
! scope="row" style="text-align:center" | 2003
|style="text-align:center;"|
| 11 || 22 || 12 || 9 || 300 || 181 || 481 || 128 || 74 || 0.5 || 0.4 || 13.6 || 8.2 || 21.9 || 5.8 || 3.4
|- style="background-color: #EAEAEA"
! scope="row" style="text-align:center" | 2004
|style="text-align:center;"|
| 11 || 21 || 9 || 6 || 345 || 177 || 522 || 128 || 51 || 0.4 || 0.3 || 16.4 || 8.4 || 24.9 || 6.1 || 2.4
|-
! scope="row" style="text-align:center" | 2005
|style="text-align:center;"|
| 11 || 22 || 7 || 5 || 324 || 188 || 512 || 131 || 38 || 0.3 || 0.2 || 14.7 || 8.5 || 23.3 || 6.0 || 1.7
|- style="background-color: #EAEAEA"
! scope="row" style="text-align:center" | 2006
|style="text-align:center;"|
| 11 || 21 || 3 || 0 || 326 || 169 || 495 || 133 || 37 || 0.1 || 0.0 || 15.5 || 8.0 || 23.6 || 6.3 || 1.8
|-
! scope="row" style="text-align:center" | 2007
|style="text-align:center;"|
| 11 || 22 || 3 || 2 || 329 || 220 || 549 || 179 || 38 || 0.1 || 0.1 || 15.0 || 10.0 || 25.0 || 8.1 || 1.7
|- style="background-color: #EAEAEA"
! scope="row" style="text-align:center" | 2008
|style="text-align:center;"|
| 11 || 18 || 17 || 6 || 259 || 153 || 412 || 153 || 39 || 0.9 || 0.3 || 14.4 || 8.5 || 22.9 || 8.5 || 2.2
|-
! scope="row" style="text-align:center" | 2009
|style="text-align:center;"|
| 11 || 12 || 3 || 1 || 195 || 101 || 296 || 84 || 20 || 0.3 || 0.1 || 16.3 || 8.4 || 24.7 || 7.0 || 1.7
|- class="sortbottom"
! colspan=3| Career
! 265
! 174
! 124
! 3665
! 2176
! 5841
! 1546
! 560
! 0.7
! 0.5
! 13.8
! 8.2
! 22.0
! 5.8
! 2.1
|}

Achievements and honours

Richmond Best and Fairest 2004, 2005
All-Australian 2005, 2006
International Rules 2004
 100 Tiger Treasures "Goal of the Century" Nominee (2008)

Unions NT
In 2018, Bowden was appointed general secretary of Unions NT, the peak body for the labour movement in the Northern Territory.

Politics

|}
In February 2020, Bowden ran for and won the 2020 Johnston by-election to the Northern Territory Legislative Assembly.

References

External links

1978 births
Living people
Richmond Football Club players
All-Australians (AFL)
Jack Dyer Medal winners
Australian rules footballers from the Northern Territory
Allies State of Origin players
Australia international rules football team players
Members of the Northern Territory Legislative Assembly
Australian Labor Party members of the Northern Territory Legislative Assembly
21st-century Australian politicians
People from Alice Springs